The Halberstadt D.I was a prototype fighter aircraft built in Germany in 1916 as a scaled down version of the firm's earlier B.II two seater. It was a conventional, two-bay biplane with staggered wings of nearly equal span and fixed, tailskid undercarriage. The engine was the same Mercedes D.I that was fitted to the B.II, and a single machine gun was fitted. Two prototypes were evaluated by the Idflieg, their performance being found inadequate. The modifications required to bring the aircraft up to an acceptable standard would result in the Halberstadt D.II later the same year.

Specifications

References

 
 
 
 

1910s German fighter aircraft
D.I
Single-engined tractor aircraft
Biplanes
Aircraft first flown in 1915